Vapour-pressure deficit, or VPD, is the difference (deficit) between the amount of moisture in the air and how much moisture the air can hold when it is saturated.  Once air becomes saturated, water will condense out to form clouds, dew or films of water over leaves.  It is this last instance that makes VPD important for greenhouse regulation.  If a film of water forms on a plant leaf, it becomes far more susceptible to rot.  On the other hand, as the VPD increases, the plant needs to draw more water from its roots. In the case of cuttings, the plant may dry out and die.  For this reason the ideal range for VPD in a greenhouse is from 0.45 kPa to 1.25 kPa, ideally sitting at around 0.85 kPa.  As a general rule, most plants grow well at VPDs of between 0.8 and 0.95 kPa.

In ecology, it is the difference between the actual water vapour pressure and the saturation water vapour pressure at a particular temperature. Unlike relative humidity, vapour-pressure deficit has a simple nearly straight-line relationship to the rate of evapotranspiration and other measures of evaporation.

Computing VPD for plants in a greenhouse 

To compute the VPD, we need the ambient (greenhouse) air temperature, the relative humidity and, if possible, the canopy air temperature.  We must then compute the saturation pressure.  Saturation pressure can be looked up in a psychrometric chart or derived from the Arrhenius equation; a way to compute it directly from temperature is

where:
 is the saturation vapor pressure in PSI,
,
,
,
,
,
,
 is temperature of the air in the Rankine scale.

To convert between Rankine and degrees Fahrenheit:

We compute this pressure for both the ambient and canopy temperatures.

We then can compute the actual partial pressure of the water vapour in the air by multiplying by the relative humidity [%]:

and finally VPD using  or 

when the canopy temperature is known.

Or simply

Climate 
VPD can be a limiting factor in plant growth. Climate change is predicted to increase the importance of VPD in plant growth, and will further limit growth rates across ecosystems.

Application in contexts of wildfire 
The vapour pressure deficit can be utilized when predicting behaviour of a wildfire. Such predictions are an essential tool of wildfire suppression.

See also
 Water vapour

References

Psychrometrics